Tamás Szűcs (born February 18, 1981) is a Hungarian former swimmer, who specialized in freestyle events. He is a two-time SEC titleholder in the 50 and 200 m freestyle, and a former member of the swimming team for the South Carolina Gamecocks at the University of South Carolina in Columbia, South Carolina.

Szucs qualified for two swimming events at the 2004 Summer Olympics in Athens, by clearing a FINA B-standard entry time of 1:50.79 (200 m freestyle) from the national championships in Budapest. In the  200 m freestyle, Szucs challenged seven other swimmers on the fifth heat, including three-time Olympian Jacob Carstensen of Denmark. He edged out South Korea's Han Kyu-Chul to take a seventh spot and thirty-second overall by two hundredths of a second (0.02) in 1:52.26. Szucs also teamed up with Balázs Gercsák, Balázs Makány, and Tamás Kerékjártó in the 4×200 m freestyle relay. Swimming the anchor leg, Szucs recorded a split of 1:52.35, and the Hungarian team finished the heats in sixteenth overall with a slowest final time of 7:31.78.

References

External links
Player Bio – South Carolina Gamecocks

1981 births
Living people
Hungarian male swimmers
Olympic swimmers of Hungary
Swimmers at the 2004 Summer Olympics
Hungarian male freestyle swimmers
South Carolina Gamecocks men's swimmers
University of South Carolina alumni
Swimmers from Budapest
20th-century Hungarian people
21st-century Hungarian people